The Battle of the Nobles was an important confrontation in the Berber Revolt in c. 740 AD. It resulted in a major Berber victory over the Arabs near Tangier Morocco. During the battle, numerous Arab aristocrats were slaughtered, which led to the conflict being called the "Battle of the Nobles". Zenata Berber chieftain Khalid ibn Hamid al-Zanati led the revolting Berber soldiers.

Background

The Maghreb in the early eighth century was under Umayyad rule. The Berber Revolt broke out in early 740 in western Morocco, in response to the oppressive, unfair (and, by Islamic law, illegal) tax-collection and slave-tribute policies imposed upon Muslim Berbers by the governor Ubayd Allah ibn al-Habhab of Kairouan, governor of Ifriqiya and overlord of the Maghreb and al-Andalus. The Berber rebellion was inspired by Kharijite activists of the Sufrite sect, who held out the promise of a new puritan Islamic order, without ethnic or tribal discrimination, a prospect appealing to the long-suffering Berbers.

The revolt began under the leadership of the Berber chieftain (alleged water-carrier) Maysara al-Matghari. The Berber rebels successfully seized Tangiers and much of western Morocco by the late summer of 740.

The Berbers had timed their uprising carefully. The bulk of the Ifriqiyan army, under command of the general Habib ibn Abi Obeida al-Fihri, was at that moment overseas, on an expedition to conquer Sicily. The governor Obeid Allah ibn el-Habhab immediately dispatched instructions ordering Habib to break off the expedition and ship the army back to Africa. But this would take time. So, in the meantime, Obeid Allah assembled a cavalry-heavy column composed of much of the aristocratic elite of Kairouan, and placed it under the command of Khalid ibn Abi Habib al-Fihri (probably Habib's brother). This column was dispatched immediately to Tangiers and instructed to serve as the vanguard and to keep the Berber rebels in check, until the Sicilian expeditionary force disembarked and caught up with them. A second, smaller reserve army, under Abd al-Rahman ibn al-Mughira al-Adhari, was sent to Tlemcen, and instructed to hold there in case the Berber army should break through to Ifriqiya.

First Encounter
Maysara's Berber forces encountered the vanguard Ifrqiyan column of Khalid ibn Abi Habib somewhere on the outskirts of Tangiers. After a brief skirmish, Maysara ordered the Berber armies to fall back. Rather than give pursuit, the Arab cavalry commander Khalid ibn Abi Habib held the line just south of Tangiers, blockading the Berber-held city while awaiting the reinforcements from the Sicilian expedition.

Regrouping after these skirmishes, the Berber rebels deposed and killed their leader, Maysara al-Matghari, and elected the Zenata Berber chieftain, Khalid ibn Hamid al-Zanati, as the new Berber commander. The reasons for Maysara's fall are not altogether clear - possibly because his sudden cowardice shown before the Arab cavalry column proved him military unfit, possibly because the puritan Sufrite preachers found a flaw in the piety of his character, or simply because the Zenata tribal chieftains, being closer to the Ifriqiyan frontline, felt they should be the ones leading the rebellion.

The chronicler Ibn Khaldun claims Khalid ibn Abi Obeida encountered the Berber forces and held his position at the 'Shalif' river, which many commentators have taken to be the well-known Chelif river (Wadi ash-Shalif) in central Algeria. However, it is highly improbable that the Berber rebel army would have been that far east by then. Modern historians have suggested Ibn Khaldun or his transcribers made a mistake here. Julien (1961: p. 30) suggests Ibn Khaldun actually meant to say the Sebou River, whose upper reaches would indeed appropriately place the Ifriqiyan column close to Tangiers. The chronicler En-Nuweri indeed reports the skirmish was outside the walls of Tangiers.

The battle
Khalid ibn Hamid al-Zanati opted to immediately attack the Ifriqiyan army mulling around the 'Shalif' (or the outskirts of Tangiers) before the arrival of the reinforcements from Sicily. The Berber rebels under Khalid ibn Hamid overwhelmed and completely defeated the army of Khalid ibn Abi Habib, massacring the cream of the Ifriqiyan Arab nobility.

Aftermath
News of the slaughter of the Ifriqiyan nobles spread like a shock-wave. The reserve army of Ibn al-Mughira in Tlemcen fell into a panic. Seeing Sufrite preachers everywhere around the city, the troops launched a series of indiscriminate massacres, provoking a massive uprising in the hitherto-quiet city.

The Sicilian expeditionary army of Habib ibn Abi Obeida arrived too late to prevent the massacre of the nobles. Realizing they were in no position to take on the Berbers by themselves, they retreated to Tlemcen to gather the reserves, only to find that that city too was now in disarray and the troops killed or scattered.

Habib ibn Abi Obeida entrenched what remained of the Ifriqiyan army in the vicinity of Tlemcen (perhaps as far back as Tahert), and called upon Kairouan for reinforcements. The request was forwarded to Damascus.

Hearing of the defeat of the nobles, Caliph Hisham is said to have exclaimed "By God, I will most certainly rage against them with an Arab rage, and I will send against them an army whose beginning is where they are and whose end is where I am!".

In February, 741, the Umayyad Caliph Hisham appointed Kulthum ibn Iyad al-Qasi to replace the disgraced Obeid Allah as governor in Ifriqiya. Kulthum was to be accompanied by a fresh Arab army of 30,000 raised from the Syrian regiments (junds in Arabic) of the east. This would set up the even more momentous Battle of Bagdoura in late 741.

See also
Berbers and Islam
Umayyad conquest of North Africa

Notes

References

Nobles
Berber Revolt